The knockout phase of the 2011–12 UEFA Europa League began on 14 February 2012 with the round of 32, and concluded on 9 May 2012 with the final at National Arena in Bucharest, Romania.

Times up to 24 March 2012 (round of 32 and round of 16) are CET (UTC+01:00), thereafter (quarter-finals and beyond) times are CEST (UTC+02:00).

Round and draw dates
All draws held at UEFA headquarters in Nyon, Switzerland.

Matches may also be played on Tuesdays or Wednesdays instead of the regular Thursdays due to scheduling conflicts.

Format
The knockout phase involves 32 teams: the 24 teams that finished in the top two in each group in the group stage and the eight teams that finished in third place in the UEFA Champions League group stage.

Each tie in the knockout phase, apart from the final, is played over two legs, with each team playing one leg at home. The team that has the higher aggregate score over the two legs progresses to the next round. In the event that aggregate scores finish level, the away goals rule is applied, i.e. the team that scored more goals away from home over the two legs progresses. If away goals are also equal, then 30 minutes of extra time are played, divided into two 15-minute halves. The away goals rule is again applied after extra time, i.e. if there are goals scored during extra time and the aggregate score is still level, the visiting team qualifies by virtue of more away goals scored. If no goals are scored during extra time, the tie is decided by penalty shootout. In the final, the tie is played as a single match. If scores are level at the end of normal time in the final, extra time is played, followed by penalties if scores remain tied.

In the draw for the round of 32, the twelve group winners and the four best third-placed teams from the Champions League group stage (based on their match record in the group stage) are seeded, and the twelve group runners-up and the other four third-placed teams from the Champions League group stage are unseeded. A seeded team is drawn against an unseeded team, with the seeded team hosting the second leg. Teams from the same group or the same association cannot be drawn against each other. In the draws for the round of 16 onwards, there are no seedings, and teams from the same group or the same association may be drawn against each other.

Qualified teams

Europa League group stage winners and runners-up

Champions League group stage third-placed teams

Bracket

Round of 32
The first legs were played on 14 and 16 February 2012, and the second legs were played on 22 and 23 February 2012.

{{TwoLegResult|Red Bull Salzburg|AUT|1–8|Metalist Kharkiv|UKR|0–4|1–4}}

|}

First leg

Notes
Note 1: Rubin Kazan played their home match at Luzhniki Stadium, Moscow as the grass pitch at their own Central Stadium might not be in good enough condition because of the cold.
Note 2: Lokomotiv Moscow played their home match at Luzhniki Stadium, Moscow as the grass pitch at their own Lokomotiv Stadium might not be in good enough condition because of the cold.

Second legManchester City won 6–1 on aggregate.2–2 on aggregate; Athletic Bilbao won on away goals.Valencia won 2–0 on aggregate.Twente won 2–0 on aggregate.1–1 on aggregate; Standard Liège won on away goals.Udinese won 3–0 on aggregate.PSV Eindhoven won 6–2 on aggregate.Hannover 96 won 3–1 on aggregate.Manchester United won 3–2 on aggregate.Metalist Kharkiv won 8–1 on aggregate.Olympiacos won 2–0 on aggregate.AZ won 2–0 on aggregate.Atlético Madrid won 4–1 on aggregate.Schalke 04 won 4–2 on aggregate.Beşiktaş won 2–1 on aggregate.Sporting CP won 3–2 on aggregate.Round of 16
The first legs were played on 8 March, and the second legs were played on 15 March 2012.

→

|}

First leg

Second legHannover 96 won 6–2 on aggregate.Valencia won 5–3 on aggregate.AZ won 3–2 on aggregate.Athletic Bilbao won 5–3 on aggregate.2–2 on aggregate; Metalist Kharkiv won on away goals.3–3 on aggregate; Sporting CP won on away goals.Schalke 04 won 4–2 on aggregate.Atlético Madrid won 6–1 on aggregate.Quarter-finals
The first legs were played on 29 March, and the second legs were played on 5 April 2012.

|}

First leg

Second legValencia won 5–2 on aggregate.Athletic Bilbao won 6–4 on aggregate.Sporting CP won 3–2 on aggregate.Atlético Madrid won 4–2 on aggregate.Semi-finals
The first legs were played on 19 April, and the second legs were played on 26 April 2012.

|}

First leg

Second legAtlético Madrid won 5–2 on aggregate.Athletic Bilbao won 4–3 on aggregate.''

Final

References

External links
2011–12 UEFA Europa League, UEFA.com

Knockout phase
UEFA Europa League knockout phases